Stephen Holker (born 21 November 1995) is a professional rugby league footballer who played for the Hull Kingston Rovers in the Super League.

He is a product of the Hull Kingston Rovers' scholarship programme. In 2014, he was selected for the England Academy. 

He made his Super League début coming off the bench in the 2015 season against the Leeds Rhinos at Headingley.

References

1995 births
Living people
English rugby league players
Hull Kingston Rovers players
Newcastle Thunder players
Rugby league locks
Rugby league second-rows